Edward Hammond Boatner (1898–1981) was an American composer who wrote many popular concert arrangements of Black American spirituals.

Biography
Boatner was educated at Western University in Quindaro, Kansas, Boston Conservatory and received a Bachelor of Music from the Chicago Music College (Now the College of Performing Arts at Roosevelt University). He also studied music privately. He began as a Concert singer with the encouragement and assistance of Roland Hayes — who performed  many of Boatner's works on his concert programs—and choral director R. Nathaniel Dett.  He also sang leading roles with the National Negro Opera Company. For the National Baptist Convention, he served as the director of music from 1925 to 1931. Boatner was a professor for Samuel Huston College (now Huston–Tillotson University) and Wiley College in Marshall, TX. He then settled in New York conducting a studio and directed community and church choirs. This allowed him to concentrate more on composing.

Boatner was the natural father of the sax player Edward Hammond "Sonny Stitt" Boatner, Jr., but the boy - named Edward Boatner, Jr. - was given up for adoption early on to the Stitt family, growing up in Saginaw, Michigan.

Music

Notable arrangements
 "Oh, What a Beautiful City"
 "Let Us Break Bread Together"
 "Soon I Will Be Done"
 "Trampling"
 "I want Jesus to walk with me", for Marian Anderson

Notable compositions
 "Freedom Suite" for chorus, narrator, and orchestra
 "The Man from Nazareth", a "spiritual musical"
 "Julius Sees Her", a musical comedy

References
 Southern, Eileen. The Music of Black Americans: A History. W. W. Norton & Company; 3rd edition. 
 Brooks, Tim, Lost Sounds: Blacks and the Birth of the Recording Industry, 1890-1919, 470-473, Urbana: University of Illinois Press, 2004.

External links
 Biography at afrovoices.com
Edward Boatner papers, 1941–1980 at the Schomburg Center for Research in Black Culture at the New York Public Library Manuscripts and Archives Division.
Gisele Glover, “The Life and Career of Edward Boatner and Inventory of the Boatner Papers at the Schomburg Center.”  American Music Research Center Journal, vol. 8–9 (1998), pp. 89–106. 

1898 births
1981 deaths
20th-century American composers
20th-century American male musicians
20th-century classical composers
African-American classical composers
American classical composers
African-American male classical composers
American male classical composers
Boston Conservatory at Berklee alumni
Roosevelt University alumni